is a Japanese footballer currently playing as a forward for Montedio Yamagata, on loan from Sagan Tosu.

Career statistics

Club
.

Notes

References

1999 births
Living people
Association football people from Hiroshima Prefecture
Meiji University alumni
Japanese footballers
Association football forwards
J1 League players
Sagan Tosu players
Montedio Yamagata players